The Mount Cole State Forest is in western Victoria, Australia, near the town of Beaufort. The forest is around Mount Cole, which formed 390 million years ago. The Indigenous Australians, the Beeripmo balug people, called it Bereep-bereep, which means wild. The forest covers an area of 12,150 hectares, including the forest around Mount Lonarch.

The forest is on a plateau which is above grassy plains. The plateau is about 760 metres above sea level. High peaks in the forest include Mount Buangor (1,090 metres), Mount Cole (899 metres) and Ben Nevis (877 metres).

The main trees in the southern part of the forest are Messmate (Eucalyptus obliqua), Manna Gum (Eucalyptus viminalis), and Blue Gums (Eucalyptus globulus). In the north, which is drier, there are Yellow Box (Eucalyptus melliodora), and Red Stringybark (Eucalyptus macrorhyncha). There is also the rare Mount Cole Grevillea, Grevillea montis-cole. On the high peaks there are groups of Snow Gums (Eucalyptus pauciflora).

There have been 130 different birds seen in the forest, including the Powerful owl (Ninox strenua). Animals include kangaroos, wallabies, echidna, koalas and possums. In 1954, 160 koalas were set free in the forest to as part of a plan to re-establish the animals in Victorian forests. In the 19th century, deer were introduced and Sambar deer are still living in the wet gullies in the south of the forest.

Activities in the forest include camping, walking, four wheel driving, horse riding, and bird watching.

The purpose of the forest is to supply good quality hardwood logs for sawmills. The management plan for the forest also protects the water catchments of several creeks which supply water to nearby towns.

On 24 June 2021, the Andrews State Government, following an extensive review and recommendation, declerated that the Mt Cole State Forest would be added to the National Park register, providing it with additional protections. The proposed Mt Buangor National Park would be staged over the next 8 years in addition to 60,000 hectares of State forests and parks also to be added.

Mount Buangor State Park
An area of 1,940 hectares, the Mount Buangor State Park, was protected from logging in 1973. This park includes the waterfalls on Middle Creek, and the large rock faces and caves on Cave Hill.

Climate

As the ranges face into the prevailing westerly storm track, maximum temperatures are particularly cold for the altitude and latitude. Heavy snowfalls occur regularly throughout the year, and sub-freezing daily maximum temperatures have been recorded well into spring at Lookout Hill (965 metres). Cold weather is present even at the height of summer: on 02 February 2005, the daily maximum temperature did not exceed  at Lookout Hill. The ranges can be classed as having a cool mediterranean climate.

Lookout Hill (1991–2007)

Ben Nevis (2007–2020)

References

Victoria (Australia) state forests